This is a list of units of the Finnish Air Force during the Winter War:

Flying Regiment 1
Lentolaivue 10
Lentolaivue 12
Lentolaivue 14
Lentolaivue 16

Flying Regiment 2
Lentolaivue 22
Lentolaivue 24
Lentolaivue 26
Lentolaivue 28

Flying Regiment 4
Lentolaivue 42
Lentolaivue 44
Lentolaivue 46
Lentolaivue 48

F 19
F 19

Replenishment Regiment 1
Koulutuslaivue 1

Replenishment Regiment 2
Lentolaivue 29

Replenishment Regiment 4
Koulutuslaivue 4

Navy HQ
Lentolaivue 36
Täydennyslentolaivue 39

Others
Ilmasotakoulu
Lentovarikko

See also
List of units of the Finnish Air Force during the Continuation War
Aerial warfare in the Winter War

Finnish Air Force
Winter War